Chigurumamidi is a mandal in Karimnagar district in the state of Telangana in India.

References 

Mandals in Karimnagar district